Six Mile Lake is in the Township of Georgian Bay, Muskoka, Ontario and has a Provincial Park.

See also
List of lakes in Ontario

External links
Six Mile Lake Cottager's Association
http://www.anglerweb.com/fishingspots/FishingSpotDetails.aspx?LocationID=11264
Six Mile Lake Ratepayers Alliance
Lakes of the District Municipality of Muskoka